Mrad Mahjoub (born 1945) is a Tunisian football manager. He managed Tunisia at the 1985 FIFA World Youth Championship and later the full national team, as well as Tunisia's largest football clubs.

References

1945 births
Living people
Tunisian football managers
Tunisia national football team managers
Espérance Sportive de Tunis managers
CS Sfaxien managers
Al Ahli SC (Doha) managers
Club Africain football managers
Tunisian expatriate football managers
Expatriate football managers in Qatar
Tunisian expatriate sportspeople in Qatar